Forest management is a branch of forestry concerned with overall administrative, legal, economic, and social aspects, as well as scientific and technical aspects, such as silviculture, protection, and forest regulation. This includes management for timber, aesthetics, recreation, urban values, water, wildlife, inland and nearshore fisheries, wood products, plant genetic resources, and other forest resource values. Management objectives can be for conservation, utilisation, or a mixture of the two. Techniques include timber extraction, planting and replanting of different species, building and maintenance of roads and pathways through forests, and preventing fire.

Definition

The forest is a natural system that can supply different products and services. Forests supply water, mitigate climate change, provide habitats for wildlife including many pollinators which are essential for sustainable food production, provide timber and fuelwood, serve as a source of non-wood forest products including food and medicine, and contribute to rural livelihoods.

The working of this system is influenced by the natural environment: climate, topography, soil, etc., and also by human activity. The actions of humans in forests constitute forest management. In developed societies, this management tends to be elaborated and planned in order to achieve the objectives that are considered desirable.

Some forests have been and are managed to obtain traditional forest products such as firewood, fiber for paper, and timber, with little thinking for other products and services. Nevertheless, as a result of the progression of environmental awareness, management of forests for multiple use is becoming more common.

Public input and awareness

There has been increased public awareness of natural resource policy, including forest management. Public concern regarding forest management may have shifted from the extraction of timber for economic development, to maintaining the flow of the range of ecosystem services provided by forests, including provision of habitat for wildlife, protecting biodiversity, watershed management, and opportunities for recreation. Increased environmental awareness may contribute to an increased public mistrust of forest management professionals. But it can also lead to greater understanding about what professionals do for forests for nature conservation and ecological services. The importance of taking care of the forests for ecological as well as economical sustainable reasons has been shown in the TV show Ax Men.

Many tools like remote sensing, GIS and photogrammetry modelling have been developed to improve forest inventory and management planning. Since 1953, the volume of standing trees in the United States has increased by 90% due to sustainable forest management.

Wildlife considerations
The abundance and diversity of birds, mammals, amphibians and other wildlife are affected by strategies and types of forest management. Forests are important because they provide these species with food, space and water. Forest management is also important as it helps in conservation and utilization of the forest resources. 

Approximately 50 million hectares (or 24%) of European forest land is protected for biodiversity and landscape protection. Forests allocated for soil, water, and other ecosystem services encompass around 72 million hectares (32% of European forest area). Over 90% of the world's forests regenerate organically, and more than half are covered by forest management plans or equivalents.

Management intensity

Forest management varies in intensity from a leave alone, natural situation to a highly intensive regime with silvicultural interventions. Forest Management is generally increased in intensity to achieve either economic criteria (increased timber yields, non-timber forest products, ecosystem services) or ecological criteria (species recovery, fostering of rare species, carbon sequestration).

Most of the forests in Europe have management plans; on the other hand, management plans exist for less than 25 percent of forests in Africa and less than 20 percent in South America. The area of forest under management plans is increasing in all regions – globally, it has increased by 233 million ha since 2000, reaching 2.05 billion ha in 2020.

Forest certification is a globally recognized system for encouraging sustainable forest management and assuring that forest-based goods are derived from sustainably managed forests. This is a voluntary procedure in which an impartial third-party organization evaluates the quality of forest management and output against a set of criteria established by a governmental or commercial certification agency.

See also

 Biodiversity
 Certified wood
 Community forestry
 Conservation biology
 Coppicing
 Edmund Zavitz
 Environmental protection
 Even-aged timber management
 Forest farming
 Forest informatics
 Forest inventory
 Forest plans
 Growth and yield modelling
 Habitat conservation
 Healthy Forests Initiative
 Natural environment
 Natural landscape
 Nature
 Outline of forestry
 Overexploitation
 Renewable resource
 Sustainability
 Sustainable development
 Sustainable forest management
 Van Vigyan Kendra (VVK) Forest Science Centres
 Proforestation

Sources

References

 
Ecological processes
Habitat management equipment and methods